Fatale may refer to:
 Fatale (Broadway Comics), a 1996 comic book series
 Fatale (film), an American thriller film
 Fatale (Image Comics), a supernatural noir comic book
 Fatale (Marvel Comics), a fictional antagonist of the X-Men
 Damage (1992 film), a British romance
 Natasha Fatale, a character in The Rocky and Bullwinkle Show animations 
 Fatale, a 2009 vignette developed by Tale of Tales

See also
 
 Fatal (disambiguation)
 Fatalis (disambiguation)
 Fatalism, a philosophical doctrine
 Fate (disambiguation)
 Femme fatale (disambiguation)
 Lethal (disambiguation)